Lyctocoris is a genus of true bugs in the family Lyctocoridae. There are about 15 described species in Lyctocoris.

Species
These 15 species belong to the genus Lyctocoris:

 Lyctocoris campestris (Fabricius, 1794)
 Lyctocoris canadensis Kelton, 1967
 Lyctocoris dimidiatus (Spinola, 1837)
 Lyctocoris doris Van Duzee, 1921
 Lyctocoris elongatus (Reuter, 1871)
 Lyctocoris hasegawai Hiura, 1966
 Lyctocoris hawaiiensis (Kirkaldy, 1902)
 Lyctocoris ichikawai Yamada & Yasunaga
 Lyctocoris menieri Carayon, 1971
 Lyctocoris nidicola Wagner, 1955
 Lyctocoris okanaganus Kelton & Anderson, 1962
 Lyctocoris rostratus Kelton & Anderson, 1962
 Lyctocoris stalii (Reuter, 1871)
 Lyctocoris tuberosus Kelton & Anderson, 1962
 Lyctocoris uyttenboogaarti Blote, 1929

References

Further reading

External links

 

Lyctocoridae genera
Articles created by Qbugbot
Lyctocoridae